During the first twenty-four Congresses (from 1789 to 1837), Connecticut elected all its Representatives in Congress from a single multi-member Connecticut at-large congressional district.

Connecticut elected a varying number of representatives during this period.  From its inception in 1789 through the first reapportionment in 1793, there were five seats.  From 1793 through 1823, there were seven seats.  In 1823 the seats were reduced to six and in 1837 the system of at-large members was replaced with districts.

From 1903 to 1913 and from 1933 to 1965, Connecticut had a member of the United States House of Representatives who represented the state at-large, in addition to the members who represented distinct districts.

List of representatives

1789–1837: five, then seven, then six seats 
All members were elected statewide at-large on a general ticket.

In 1837, Connecticut abandoned general tickets and adopted districts instead.

1903–1913: one seat 

In 1903, one at-large seat was created, four district seats continued.

1933–1965: one seat 
In 1933, one at-large seat was created, five district seats continued.

References 

 

 Congressional Biographical Directory of the United States 1774–present

At-large
Former congressional districts of the United States
At-large United States congressional districts
Constituencies established in 1789
1789 establishments in Connecticut
Constituencies disestablished in 1837
1837 disestablishments in Connecticut
Constituencies established in 1903
1903 establishments in Connecticut
Constituencies disestablished in 1913
1913 disestablishments in Connecticut
Constituencies established in 1933
1933 establishments in Connecticut
Constituencies disestablished in 1965
1965 disestablishments in Connecticut